The 1917 Henley by-election was a by-election in Henley caused by the death of Major Valentine Fleming during World War I. The Conservative candidate Robert Hermon-Hodge won the subsequent by-election on 20 June 1917. He was unopposed due to a War-time electoral pact.

1917 in England
1917 elections in the United Kingdom
Henley-on-Thames
By-elections to the Parliament of the United Kingdom in Oxfordshire constituencies
20th century in Oxfordshire
Unopposed by-elections to the Parliament of the United Kingdom (need citation)